Simpich Character Dolls, Ltd. was a dollmaker and home-workshop employer in Colorado Springs, Colorado. In production since 1952, the founders, Bob and Jan Simpich, announced their retirement for February 2007, and the closing of their studio in the Old Colorado City Historic Commercial District.

The dolls themselves range from historical figures to mythological ones, and the most consistently popular are the Christmas-themed dolls.

The dolls have spawned other concepts since their creation, notably the marionette theater of their son, puppeteer David Simpich.

https://gazette.com/arts-entertainment/simpich-showcase-in-colorado-springs-offers-free-video-of-main-stage-marionette-performance/article_fdfd882c-7818-11ea-b076-fb896a8582e1.html

References

External links
Historic Simpich Character Dolls

Companies based in Colorado Springs, Colorado
Design companies established in 1952
Design companies disestablished in 2006
1952 establishments in Colorado
2008 disestablishments in Colorado